IFI may refer to:

 Iglesia Filipina Independente (Philippine Independent Church)
 Illinois Family Institute
 Industrial Fasteners Institute, the Independence, Ohio based trade and standards organization and publisher.
 InnerChange Freedom Initiative, a Christian prisoner program
 International Federation of Interior Architects/Designers, a global interior architecture/design umbrella organization
 International financial institutions, as in the IMF, the World Bank, etc.
 International Fund for Ireland, inter-governmental agency promoting reconciliation in Ireland
 Institut de la Francophonie pour l'Informatique, the Francophone Institute for Computer Science.
 Institut Français d'Indonésie, a French cultural institution located in Indonesia.
 Institut de Formation Internationale, a business school located in Rouen, France.
 Irish Film Institute, a cinema and national body based in Dublin, Ireland.
 Islamic Foundation of Ireland, a religious organization in Dublin, Ireland